is an English land law case that examined the rights of a 'tenant' in a situation where the 'landlord', a charitable housing association had no authority to grant a tenancy, but in which the 'tenant' sought to enforce the duty to repair on the association implied under landlord and tenant statutes. The effect of the case is to create the relationship of de facto landlord (who does not own a property but houses an occupier in a specific room at a rent) and tenant between the parties.

Facts
The council gave the London and Quadrant Housing Trust, a charitable association, a licence to use land to accommodate the homeless. For a place at Flat 2, Oval House, Rushcroft Road, in Brixton, London, Mr Bruton agreed with the trust to pay weekly rent for a flat. There was a provision that the council and LQHT had access to the property at limited times. Then he claimed he was a tenant, and the trust had an obligation to repair the flat under the Landlord and Tenant Act 1985 section 11. The Housing Trust argued that under orthodox property law principles, nemo dat quod non habet (literally meaning "no one gives what he does not have"), so because they had no lease, they could not grant a lease to Mr Bruton, and therefore they had no obligation to repair the property.

Judgment
The House of Lords held the agreement did create a tenancy and the trust was therefore under an obligation to repair. Giving the leading judgment, Lord Hoffmann held it did not matter that the landlord did not have a property right in its title. Exclusive possession is the essence of a lease, and irrelevant that the agreement purported to be a licence. The term that Mr Bruton could be told to vacate on reasonable notice was ineffective, as one cannot contract out of statute. LQHT's lack of legal title was also irrelevant because the character of the agreement, not the nature of the landlord, was the key point for deciding whether a lease existed under the LTA 1985.

Lord Slynn, Lord Jauncey concurred.

Significance
Traditionally it has been held that an estate interest (interest in land) can only arise out of one of equal or superior status. A licence is not an estate interest, and provides essentially only access to another's estate. However, the implication of the Bruton case "controversially confirms the existence in English Law of the phenomenon of the contractual or non-proprietary lease". It has been suggested by some commentators however, that Bruton was driven by policy as established in Street v Mountford, that individuals enjoying exclusive possession should be protected. There has been little reliance on the “Bruton tenancy” in later cases and it remains controversial.

See also

English land law

Notes

References
S Bright (1998) 114 LQR 345-351

External links
 The London and Quadrant website

English property case law
House of Lords cases
1999 in case law
1999 in British law
English land case law